The third season of the food reality television series, Man v. Food, premiered on the Travel Channel June 16, 2010, at 9pm Eastern Time. On Man v. Food, the host, actor and food enthusiast Adam Richman, visits a different city to sample the "big food" of its local eateries before taking on a pre-existing eating challenge at one of the local restaurants.

The final third-season tally wound up at 12 wins for Man and 9 wins for Food (despite technically finishing his challenge in Indianapolis, Adam called it a victory for Food).

Episodes

External links
 Man v. Food official website

2010 American television seasons
Man v. Food